Qaravəlli (also Karavelli, Garavelli) is a village and municipality in the Aghjabadi Rayon of Azerbaijan.  It has a population of 2,713.

References 

Populated places in Aghjabadi District